John en Marsha Ngayon '91 is a Philippine film based on the television series John en Marsha.

Plot
The story is set in 1991 where John and Marsha, still impoverished, manages to send Shirley to college where she takes up Nursing.  John gets employed by a rich man as a babysitter for his bratty grandson.  Regardless of how he was harshly treated by his employers, John takes it as an opportunity to earn more money to secure Shirley's future. But while he and Marsha thought that Shirley was doing good in college, she ends up having a boyfriend named Edwin who accompanies her in cutting classes.

Shirley's series of secret rendezvous with Edwin results with her getting pregnant.  But unknown to her, Edwin has accidentally met her father John a lot of times, with John ending up on the wrong side of the fence. So when she introduced Edwin to her parents, John ends up disapproving the relationship.  Moreover, he also drives Shirley out of his house after finding out she got pregnant with Edwin's child.

Soon after John felt guilty of what he had done.  To make amends, he uses up his savings from his job to buy the basic needs of Edwin and Shirley's baby and furnish the new family's house while hiding his identity out of shame for what he did. Eventually, Shirley finds out the good deed her father has done and buries the hatchet with the rest of the family.

Cast 
Dolphy as John 
Nida Blanca as Marsha
Maricel Soriano as Shirley
Rolly Quizon as Rolly
Dely Atay-atayan as Donya Delilah
Matutina as herself
Jaime Garchitorena as Edwin
Atong Redillas as John John 
LA Lopez as JV
Babalu as himself

Related media
Television series
John en Marsha (1973)

Films
John and Marsha (1974)
John and Marsha sa Amerika (1975)
John and Marsha '77 (1977)
John & Marsha '80 (1980)
Da Best of John & Marsha (1984)
John en Marsha '85 (1985)

References

External links 
 

1991 films
Philippine comedy films
1990s Tagalog-language films
Films about race and ethnicity
Films directed by Luciano B. Carlos